Sumathi Murthy is a Hindustani classical vocalist, composer and LGBT right activist based in Bangalore. She hails from the Agra gharana of singing. She identifies herself as a queer.

Music career
She started performing from the age of 12 years. She received her training in music from Pandit Ramarao Naik for 17 years.

She has been involved in a project called Sakhiri with Dr. Floy which consisted of a multi media show of mixing genders, electronics, visual images, poetry and music. She worked as a composer, singer and lyric writer in this project.

Queer activism
In 2006, she formed a support group for female-born queer people named LesBiT. She and Sunil Menon have been doing an oral history project to share the stories of queer people. They have collectively written the book Towards Gender Inclusivity which focuses on female-born gender and sexual minorities in south India.

Murthy was also featured in the documentary Breaking Free, which talked about the LGBTQ community and the impact of the controversial Section 377 of the Indian Penal Code.

Publications
 Towards Gender Inclusivity: A Study on Contemporary Concerns around Gender (with Sunil Mohan)

References

Year of birth missing (living people)
Living people
Indian women classical musicians
Queer women
Indian LGBT musicians
Musicians from Bangalore